Dear Cosmo Tour also known as Pentagon 1st Japan Zepp tour - "Dear Cosmo" is the first Japanese zepp concert tour by the South Korean boy band Pentagon for the promotion of their debut in the Japanese market. They toured Osaka, Nagoya, Fukuoka, and Tokyo from  January 10 to February 12, 2019.

Set list
The following set list is obtained from the shows.
{{hidden
| headercss = background: #041E42; font-size: 100%; width: 68%;
| contentcss = text-align: left; font-size: 100%; width: 68%;
| header = 
| content =
 "Pretty Pretty"
 "Skateboard"

Intro
 "Gorilla" 
 "Can You Feel It" (감이 오지)
 "Shine" 
 "Wake Up" (悪夢)

VCR
 "Perfect" (Ed Sheeran) (Yan An solo)  / "Lift Off"  / "Drifting Apart" (멀어져) (Hui & Shinwon duet)
 "Navigation"   / "Bohemian Rhapsody (Jinho solo)  / "Trust Me"  
 "Stay"   / "PPAP" (Daimaou Kosaka cover) (Hui, Hongseok, Shinwon, Yuto, Kino dance) 

VCR 2
  "And U"
 "Cosmo" 
 "Runaway" 
 "Naughty Boy"
 "Shine"  

Encore
 "Thumbs Up"
 "To Universe"
}}

{{hidden
| headercss = background: #041E42; font-size: 100%; width: 68%;
| contentcss = text-align: left; font-size: 100%; width: 68%;
| header = 
| content =
 "Pretty Pretty"
 "Skateboard

Intro
 "Gorilla" 
 "Can You Feel It" (감이 오지)
 "Shine" 
 "Wake Up" (悪夢)

VCR
 "(Hui solo)  / "Nandemonaiya"   / "Tears" (X Japan) (Jinho & Hongseok duet)  
 "Lonely" (Kino solo)  / "Original" (잠시만 안녕) (MC the Max) (Jinho & Hongseok duet) / "Lift Off"   
 "Do It For Fun"   / "Trust Me"   / "PPAP" (Daimaou Kosaka) (Hui, Hongseok, Shinwon, Yeo One, Yuto dance cover) 

VCR 2
  "Dear Friend"
 "Cosmo"
 "Runaway"
 "Naughty Boy"

Encore
 "Thumbs Up"
 "To Universe"
}}

 indicates setlist in Osaka
 indicates setlist in Nagoya
 indicates setlist in Fukuoka

Tour dates

Media
Television Broadcast

References

Pentagon (South Korean band)
2019 concert tours
Pentagon (South Korean band) concert tours